In New Zealand, animals are used in many situations for research, testing and teaching – commonly referred to as RTT.

Animal use in RTT is strictly controlled under the Animal Welfare Act 1999  and organisations using animals must follow an approved code of ethical conduct. This sets out the policies and procedures that need to be adopted and followed by the organisation and its animal ethics committee (AEC). Every project must be approved and monitored by an AEC which includes lay members. The principles of the Three Rs are embodied in the Animal Welfare Act, the operation of all AECs, and all activities that involve the use of animals in research.

Introduction 

In New Zealand, it is legal under the Animal Welfare Act 1999 (the Act) to use animals for research, testing and teaching (RTT) purposes. However, because the nature of this work may, in some cases, mean that potential benefits to humans, other animals or the environment may result in some harm to animals, such use carries significant responsibilities and strict legislative obligations.

Statistics 

The Ministry for Primary Industries reported that 310,287 animals were used in New Zealand in 2014. The most common species used were cattle (24.3%), mice (18.8%), sheep (14.4%), fish (13.3%), birds (10.2%) and deer (8.1%). The large number of livestock used in research reflects the large amount of agricultural research conducted in New Zealand.

The most common areas of research were 'Basic biological research' (24.3%), 'veterinary research' (19.2%), 'teaching' (16.9%) and 'animal husbandry' (15.4%). According to the Ministry for Primary Industries, only 24% of animals die, or are euthanised, as part of the research. 1.9% of animals used in 2014 were transgenic.

Legislation 

Part 6 of the Act applies specifically to the use of animals for RTT purposes.

Under the Act:

 Any person or organisation wishing to manipulate animals for RTT purposes must do so under a Code of Ethical Conduct (CEC)  approved by the Director-General of the Ministry for Primary Industries (MPI), and must establish an animal ethics committee (AEC) to oversee the use of animals within the institution.
 The CEC sets out the policies and procedures to ensure that its AEC can operate effectively and that the organisation can meet its obligations under the Act.
 The membership of the AEC is set within the legislation and must include three members whose independence from the organisation adds credibility and transparency to the AEC's activities. These include:
 
 a nominee of an approved animal welfare organisation (such as the SPCA);
 a nominee of the New Zealand Veterinary Association; and
 a layperson to represent the public interest and who is nominated by a local government body.
 Animal ethics committees monitor researchers and the animal use that they have approved.
 Organisations using animals for RTT must undergo an independent audit at a maximum of every five years to ensure compliance with the Act and with their own CEC.
 Records must be kept for all animals used for the purposes of RTT for five years. Code holders are required to submit an annual return, which includes the number of animals used and the impact on their welfare. The statistics supplied to MPI are published each year as an appendix to the National Animal Ethics Advisory Committee (NAEAC) annual report.

The Three Rs 

The Three Rs  – Replacement, Reduction and Refinement – relate to the ethical use of animals in RTT. 
 Replacement - wherever possible, animals should be replaced with non-animal alternatives e.g. computer modelling.
 Reduction – numbers of animals should be the minimum necessary to achieve a meaningful result.
 Refinement - pain and distress should be reduced as much as possible e.g. by using painkillers, by ensuring appropriate housing or by ensuring the skill of those involved in the use and care of animals.

The importance of the Three Rs is demonstrated by the New Zealand Three Rs Programme, a collaboration between the Massey University Animal Welfare Science and Bioethics Centre, MPI, the Australian and New Zealand Council for the Care of Animals in Research and Teaching (ANZCCART) and NAEAC.  The key aims of the Programme are:

 to promote understanding and application of the Three Rs in New Zealand;
 to encourage new Three Rs strategies in New Zealand;
 to profile New Zealand's Three Rs contributions nationally and internationally
 to network and liaise with other Three Rs centres internationally

The Three Rs have been incorporated into New Zealand's legislation as can be seen in the following section on AEC considerations.

Animal ethics committees 

The legislation requires that AEC members consider any RTT project using animals. Their questions must include the following:

 Are the scientific or educational objectives credible?
 What is the potential harm to the animals and how can it be minimised (refinement)?
 Is the experimental design credible?
 Are animals necessary and, if so, is the choice of species appropriate (replacement)?
 Can a less sentient species be used?
 Are the animal numbers the minimum necessary to get a meaningful result (reduction)?
 What procedures are in place to care for the animals (refinement)?
 Are those involved in the project suitably qualified (refinement)?
 What measures have been taken to ensure that experimental work is not being duplicated (reduction)?

In considering projects, AECs may approve the work, they may require certain conditions to be put in place before approval is granted, or they may reject the proposal. They are also required to monitor compliance with any approved project, and can suspend or revoke the approval if necessary.

The National Animal Ethics Advisory Committee 

The National Animal Ethics Advisory Committee (NAEAC)  is an independent committee whose membership includes animal welfare experts, veterinarians, scientists and lay people. It provides independent, expert advice to the Minister for Primary Industries on policy and practices relating to the use of animals in RTT. The committee also provides advice and support to AECs to maximise good decision-making. Assistance is provided in the following ways:

 AEC workshops;
 provision of induction packs for new AEC members;
 publication of policies and procedures;
 distribution of newsletters;
 response to queries from AECs;
 publication of an ‘occasional paper’ series on issues of importance to AECs;
 visits to regional AECs.

NAEAC also presents an annual "Three Rs Award" which recognises achievement in implementation of the Three Rs by an individual or organisation.

Abbreviations and acronyms 

AEC - Animal Ethics Committee
ANZCCART - Australian and New Zealand Council for the Care of Animals in Research and Teaching
AWA - Animal Welfare Act 1999
CEC - Codes of Ethical Conduct
MPI - Ministry for Primary Industries
NAEAC - National Animal Ethics Advisory Committee
RTT - Research, testing and teaching
SPCA - Society for Prevention of Cruelty to Animals

See also
Animal welfare in New Zealand
Agriculture in New Zealand

References

External links
New Zealand Anti-Vivisection Society
Understanding Animal Research (UK)
Speaking of Research

Animal law
New Zealand
Animal welfare in New Zealand
Law of New Zealand
Research in New Zealand